Virginia Cathryn "Gena" Rowlands (born June 19, 1930) is an American retired actress, whose career in film, stage, and television has spanned seven decades. She is one of the last living actresses from the Golden Age of Hollywood. A four-time Emmy and two-time Golden Globe winner, she is known for her collaborations with her late actor-director husband John Cassavetes in ten films, including A Woman Under the Influence (1974) and Gloria (1980), both of which earned her nominations for the Academy Award for Best Actress. She also won the Silver Bear for Best Actress for Opening Night (1977). She is also known for her performances in Woody Allen's Another Woman (1988), and her son Nick Cassavetes's film, The Notebook (2004). In 2021, Richard Brody of The New Yorker said, “The most important and original movie actor of the past half century-plus is Gena Rowlands.” In November 2015, Rowlands received an Honorary Academy Award in recognition of her unique screen performances.

Early years 
Rowlands was born on June 19, 1930, in Cambria, Wisconsin.  Her mother, Mary Allen née Neal, was a housewife who later worked as an actress under the stage name Lady Rowlands. Her father, Edwin Myrwyn Rowlands, was a banker and state legislator. He was a member of the Wisconsin Progressive Party, and was of Welsh descent. She had an elder brother, David Rowlands.

Her family moved to Washington, D.C., in 1939, when Edwin was appointed to a position in the United States Department of Agriculture; moved to Milwaukee, Wisconsin, in 1942, when he was appointed as branch manager of the Office of Price Administration; and later moved to Minneapolis, Minnesota. From 1947–50, she attended the University of Wisconsin, where she was a popular student already renowned for her beauty. While in college, she was a member of Kappa Kappa Gamma. She left for New York City to study drama at the American Academy of Dramatic Arts.

Career

Early roles (1952–1967) 

In the early 1950s, Rowlands performed with repertory theatre companies and at the Provincetown Playhouse. She made her Broadway debut in The Seven Year Itch and toured in a national production of the play. In 1956, she starred in the Broadway play Middle of the Night opposite Edward G. Robinson.

Rowlands costarred with Paul Stewart in the 26-episode syndicated TV series Top Secret (1954–55). She guest-starred on such anthology television series as Robert Montgomery Presents, Armstrong Circle Theatre, Studio One, Appointment with Adventure, The United States Steel Hour and Goodyear Television Playhouse, all in 1955. In 1959, Rowlands appeared in the western series Laramie, alongside her husband John Cassavetes in the detective series Johnny Staccato, and in the western series Riverboat, starring Darren McGavin. In 1961, she appeared in the adventure series The Islanders, set in the South Pacific, and in Target: The Corruptors!, starring Stephen McNally. She guest-starred in The Lloyd Bridges Show, the detective series 77 Sunset Strip, the westerns Bonanza and The Virginian, and Breaking Point, all in 1963. In 1964, she guest-starred in the medical drama Dr. Kildare and in two episodes of Burke's Law. She appeared in four episodes of Alfred Hitchcock Presents, three of which were after the series had been renamed The Alfred Hitchcock Hour. In 1967, she was cast as socialite Adrienne Van Leyden in the prime-time ABC soap opera Peyton Place.

Rowlands made her film debut in The High Cost of Loving in 1958. In 1962, she starred in director David Miller's Lonely Are the Brave, with Kirk Douglas and Walter Matthau. She played the former lover of the Kirk Douglas character, now the wife of the Douglas character's best friend.

Cassavetes era (1963–1984) 

Rowlands and Cassavetes made ten films together: A Child Is Waiting (1963), Faces (1968), Machine Gun McCain (1969), Minnie and Moskowitz (1971), A Woman Under the Influence (1974; nomination for Academy Award for Best Actress), Two-Minute Warning (1976), Opening Night (1977), Gloria (1980; nomination for Academy Award for Best Actress), Tempest (1982), and Love Streams (1984).

According to Boston University film scholar Ray Carney, Rowlands sought to suppress an early version of Cassavetes's first film, Shadows, that Carney says he rediscovered after decades of searching. Rowlands also became involved in the screenings of Husbands and Love Streams, according to Carney. The UCLA Film and Television Archive mounted a restoration of Husbands, as it was pruned down (without Cassavetes's consent, and in violation of his contract) by Columbia Pictures several months after its release, in an attempt to restore as much of the removed content as possible. At Rowlands's request, UCLA created an alternative print with almost ten minutes of content edited out, as Rowlands felt that these scenes were in poor taste. The alternative print is the only one that has been made available for rental.

Late career (1985–present) 

In 1985, Rowlands played the mother in the critically acclaimed made-for-TV movie An Early Frost. She won an Emmy for her portrayal of former First Lady of the United States Betty Ford in the 1987 made-for-TV movie The Betty Ford Story.

In 1988, Rowlands starred in Woody Allen's dramatic film Another Woman. She played Marion Post, a middle-aged professor who is prompted to a journey of self-discovery when she overhears the therapy sessions of another woman (Mia Farrow). The review in Time Out described the character's trajectory: "Marion gets to thinking, and is appalled to realise that so many assumptions about her own life and marriage are largely unfounded: in her desire for a controlled existence, she has evaded the emotional truth about relationships with her best friend (Sandy Dennis), brother (Harris Yulin) and husband (Ian Holm)." Time Out praised the "marvellous" performances in the film, adding, "Rowlands' perfectly pitched approach to a demanding role is particularly stunning." Film4 called her performance "sublime", while Roger Ebert noted that it marked a considerable change in tone from her work with Cassavetes, thus showing "how good an actress Rowlands has been all along."

In 2002, Rowlands appeared in Mira Nair's HBO movie Hysterical Blindness, for which she won her third Emmy. Next year she appeared as Mrs. Hellman an episode  from the third season of Numb3rs. She played a Nazi survivor whose whole family was killed. The family owned a painting that the Nazis confiscated. Later on the painting reappeared. The new owner lent the painting to an art gallery in Los Angeles but while on display it was stolen. F.B.I. agent Don Eppes, played by Rob Morrow, tries to figure out what really happened. Rowlands received rave reviews for this role. She has been a spokesperson for people who were persecuted by the Nazis so this role was a perfect match for her.

She was later seen in The Notebook (2004), which was directed by her son Nick Cassavetes. The same year, she won her first Daytime Emmy for her role as Mrs. Evelyn Ritchie in The Incredible Mrs. Ritchie. In 2005, she appeared opposite Kate Hudson, Peter Sarsgaard, and John Hurt in the gothic thriller The Skeleton Key.

In 2007, she played a supporting role opposite Parker Posey and Melvil Poupaud in Broken English, an independent American feature written and directed by her daughter Zoe Cassavetes. In 2009, she appeared on an episode of Monk ("Mr. Monk and the Lady Next Door"). On March 2, 2010, she appeared on an episode of NCIS as lead character Leroy Jethro Gibbs's former mother-in-law, who is embroiled in a murder investigation. In 2014, she starred in the film adaptation of Six Dance Lessons in Six Weeks. In 2015, she described herself as generally retired from acting.

Personal life 
Rowlands was married to John Cassavetes from April 9, 1954, until his death on February 3, 1989. They met at the American Academy at Carnegie Hall, where they were both students. They had three children, all actor-directors: Nick, Alexandra, and Zoe. Rowlands married retired businessman Robert Forrest in 2012.

Rowlands has stated that she was a fan of actress Bette Davis while growing up. She played Davis's daughter in the 1979 made-for-TV film Strangers.

Filmography

Film

Television

Awards and nominations 
Rowlands has been nominated for two Academy Awards, eight Primetime Emmy Awards, one Daytime Emmy Award, eight Golden Globe Awards, three Satellite Awards, and two SAG Awards. Some of her notable wins are a Silver Bear for Best Actress, three Primetime Emmy Awards and one Daytime Emmy Award, two Golden Globe Awards, two National Board of Review Awards, and two Satellite Awards.

In January 2015, Rowlands was presented with a lifetime achievement award by the Los Angeles Film Critics Association. She was also chosen by the Academy Awards board of governors to receive an Honorary Academy Award that same year. At the Governors Awards ceremony, she was honored by Laura Linney and Cate Blanchett who offered up tributes; and Rowland's son Nick Cassavetes presented the award to her. The press release described Rowlands as "an original talent" whose "devotion to her craft has earned her worldwide recognition as an independent film icon".

Academy Awards

Primetime Emmy Award

Golden Globe Awards

Other Awards

References

Further reading

External links 

 
 
 

1930 births
Living people
Academy Honorary Award recipients
Actresses from Wisconsin
American Academy of Dramatic Arts alumni
American people of Welsh descent
American people of Irish descent
American film actresses
American stage actresses
American television actresses
Best Drama Actress Golden Globe (film) winners
Best Miniseries or Television Movie Actress Golden Globe winners
Outstanding Performance by a Lead Actress in a Miniseries or Movie Primetime Emmy Award winners
Outstanding Performance by a Supporting Actress in a Miniseries or Movie Primetime Emmy Award winners
Actresses from Washington, D.C.
People from Cambria, Wisconsin
University of Wisconsin–Madison alumni
20th-century American actresses
21st-century American actresses
Silver Bear for Best Actress winners
Cassavetes family
Actors from Madison, Wisconsin
Daytime Emmy Award winners